The Milwaukee Brewers are a Major League Baseball team based in Milwaukee, Wisconsin. They play in the National League Central division. Established in Seattle, Washington, as the Seattle Pilots in 1969, the team became the Milwaukee Brewers after relocating to Milwaukee in 1970. The first game of the new baseball season for a team is played on Opening Day, and being named the Opening Day starting pitcher is an honor which is given to the player who is expected to lead the pitching staff that season, though there are various strategic reasons why a team's best pitcher might not start on Opening Day. The Brewers have used 33 different Opening Day starting pitchers in their 54 seasons.

The Pilots, whose home ballpark was Sick's Stadium, played their inaugural Opening Day game on the road against the California Angels at Anaheim Stadium in Anaheim, California, on April 8, 1969. Marty Pattin was their starting pitcher that day; he earned the win in a game the Pilots won, 4–3. In 1970, the team relocated to Wisconsin and began playing their home games at Milwaukee County Stadium. The Brewers opened their first season in Milwaukee at home with Opening Day starter Lew Krausse Jr. taking the loss in a 12–0 defeat by the California Angels on April 9. County Stadium was home to the Brewers for 31 seasons through 2000. Their final Opening Day game at the facility occurred on April 26, 1995. Starter Ricky Bones took a no decision in the Brewers' 12–3 win over the Chicago White Sox. Steve Woodard received an unusual no decision in 2000, when the team's Opening Day game against the Cincinnati Reds was called in the sixth inning due to rain, with the score tied at 3. The team moved into American Family Field, then known as Miller Park, in 2001, but they did not play their first Opening Day game at the new stadium until five years later. In that game, held on April 3, 2006, Milwaukee defeated the Pittsburgh Pirates, 5–2; starter Doug Davis did not figure in the decision.

The Brewers' 33 Opening Day starting pitchers have a combined Opening Day record of 17 wins, 16 losses, and 21 no decisions in 54 Opening Day starts. They earned a win in their only Opening Day start in Seattle. In Milwaukee, they have 16 wins, 16 losses, and 21 no decisions in 53 Opening Day starts. At Milwaukee County Stadium, they had a record of 3 wins, 2 losses, and 5 no decisions in 10 Opening Days. At American Family Field, they have a record of 3 wins, 4 losses, and 5 no decisions in 12 Opening Days. The Brewers have an aggregate record of 6 wins, 6 losses, and 9 no decisions in 21 Opening Day starts played at home. Milwaukee's starters have a record of 11 wins, 10 losses, and 12 no decisions in 33 Opening Day starts on the road.

Ben Sheets has the most Opening Day starts for the Brewers, with six, followed by Yovani Gallardo (5); Teddy Higuera and Jim Slaton (3); and Ricky Bones, Mike Caldwell, Jim Colborn, Cal Eldred, Marty Pattin, Don Sutton, Bill Wegman, and Brandon Woodruff (2). Gallardo (2010–2014) made five consecutive Opening Day starts. Sheets (2002–2005) made four consecutive starts, while Higuera (1986–1988) made three and  Bones (1995–1996), Colborn (1973–1974), Sheets (2007–2008), Slaton (1975–1976), Sutton (1983–1984), Wegman (1992–1993), and Woodruff (2020–2021) made back-to-back starts.

Opening Day results

Pitchers
Opening Day starting pitchers are listed in descending order by the number of Opening Day starts for the Brewers.

References 

Opening Day starting pitchers
Milwaukee Brewerse